Kamshet railway station or Kamshet station is a railway station of Pune Suburban Railway on Mumbai–Chennai line.

Local trains between Pune Junction–, –Lonavla stop here.

The only passenger train having a stop at this station is the Pune Junction– Passenger.

The station has two platforms and a foot overbridge. Nearby attractions are two hilly forts, namely Tikona Fort and Tung Fort, and the Pavna Dam and boating.

References

Pune Suburban Railway
Pune railway division
Railway stations in Pune district